El Adwah is a village in the Egyptian governorate of the Sharqia Governorate. The estimated population is 10,650 inhabitants.

Notable people
Mohamed Morsi, fifth President of Egypt

References

External links
 El Adwah Online (in Arabic)

Populated places in Sharqia Governorate